Heidi Ewing is an American documentary filmmaker and the co-director of Jesus Camp, The Boys of Baraka, 12th & Delaware, DETROPIA, Norman Lear: Just Another Version of You          One of Us, Love Fraud (series), I Carry You With Me (narrative) and Endangered.

Biography
Ewing is a native of the Detroit area. She was introduced to film by her father who encouraged her and her siblings to watch Fellini films at a young age. But it was her exposure to Alfred Hitchcock's "Vertigo" at the age of ten that had the greatest impact. "It blew my mind into thousands of pieces, and I couldn't stop going back to see it over and over again," she says. "I didn't know something could be so potent."

Ewing graduated of Mercy High School and then attended and graduated from the Georgetown University.

In 2001 she and Rachel Grady founded Loki Films in New York.

Her first film as a director was the short "Dissident: Oswaldo Paya and The Varela Project," a short film financed by the National Democratic Institute  about the now deceased activist and his efforts to push for human rights in Cuba.

Her first feature-length documentary,  "The Boys of Baraka," was co-directed with Rachel Grady. The film, made with ITVS, premiered at the South by Southwest Film Festival and was release theatrically by ThinkFilm before airing on PBS. The film follows a group of 12-year-old boys from Baltimore who leave home for an experimental middle school in rural Kenya.

In 2006 she and Grady released "Jesus Camp," which premiered at The Tribeca Film Festival and was released by Magnolia Pictures. The film was nominated for the 2006 Academy Award.

In 2011 she returned to her native Detroit to make "DETROPIA," an impressionistic documentary that focuses on the challenges of a shrinking city and those who refuse to give up on it. The film premiered at the 2012 Sundance Film Festival and won the editing award 

In 2017 she co-directed Netflix Original film, "One of Us,"  which follows three Hasidic Jews who attempt to leave the insular community and pursue a secular life. The film premiered at the 2017 Toronto International Film Festival. Ewing appeared on Charlie Rose in October 2017 to discuss the film and said that Hasidic Jews died disproportionally in the Holocaust because they "refused to blend in". She later apologized.

Ewing made her narrative debut in 2020 with "I Carry You With Me," a love story based on her two close friends, Ivan and Gerardo, who had emigrated to the United States from a conservative town in Mexico. The film began as a documentary, but over the course of the process Ewing realized it was best presented as a narrative film with non-fiction elements woven through. The film made  its world premiere at the 2020 Sundance Film Festival where it won the jury and audiences awards in the festival's NEXT section. The film was nominated for two Independent Spirit Awards and was released by Sony Pictures Classics in 2021.

Ewing recently co-directed "Endangered,"  a film for HBO on the silencing of journalists around the world.

Filmography

References

External links

 
C-SPAN Q&A interview with Heidi Ewing, October 28, 2012

Living people
Year of birth missing (living people)
People from Farmington Hills, Michigan
American documentary filmmakers
Walsh School of Foreign Service alumni
Film directors from Michigan
American women documentary filmmakers
Sundance Film Festival award winners